= No flats =

No flats may refer to:

- C major, a major musical key with no flats
- A minor, a minor musical key with no flats
